Diego Faria da Silva (born 18 January 1989 in Teófilo Otoni) is a Brazilian footballer who played as a midfielder.

Career

Phoenix
On 30 October 2012 it was announced that Faria had signed with new expansion franchise Phoenix FC on the USL Pro. On 23 March 2013 Silva made his debut for Phoenix in their first ever game against the Los Angeles Blues in which he played 75 minutes as Phoenix lost 2–0.

Career statistics

Club
Statistics accurate as of 24 March 2013

References

1989 births
Living people
Brazilian footballers
Sportspeople from Minas Gerais
Association football midfielders
Santos FC players
Phoenix FC players
Expatriate soccer players in the United States
USL Championship players